Swapna Dutt Chalasani (born 30 August 1981) is an Indian film producer based in Hyderabad. Swapna Dutt is the daughter of C. Ashwini Dutt, a well known Indian film producer and the founder of Vyjayanthi Movies. She began her career in film making at the age of 18 as associate producer of the movie Azad in 2000. Soon after her first project Swapna Co-Produced movies with her father under the banner of Vyjayanthi Movies and with her sister Priyanka Dutt. Both Priyanka and Swapna revived Swapna Cinema in 2014.

Early life and family
Swapna Dutt was born in Vijayawada to the most renowned producer's family in Telugu film industry. Swapna dutt is the eldest daughter of C. Ashwini Dutt and Vinaya Kumari, her father C. Ashwini Dutt is a well known Indian film producer from Telugu film industry and the founder of Vyjayanthi Movies. Swapna has two younger sisters Priyanka Dutt, who co-produced movies with Swapna and her father and Sravanthi Dutt who is a businessman in the hospitality sector. Swapna Dutt holds an MBA Degree from The University Of Findlay. On 19 December 2010 Swapna married Prasad Varma. She has a daughter, Navya Vyjayanthi.

Career

Television
During her Business Management studies in the Ohio University, while assisting her father and taking care of the production side of the movies shooting schedules overseas. Swapna realized that she need do something more and have to create a path of her own in the media industry. After pursuing her MBA from The  University Of Findlay, Ohio in 2006 back in Hyderabad Swapna founded Vyjayanthi Televentures Pvt.Ltd. which changed the face of television industry by Producing consecutive different programs in popular channels of Telugu. On 7 October 2008, the then Chief Minister of Andhra Pradesh, Dr. Y. S. Rajasekhara Reddy launched Local TV - the much publicized small screen venture of Vyjayanthi Televentures Private Limited. The event was also graced by Tollywood's doyen Dr. Akkineni Nageswara Rao.

Local TV is planning its inroads to satellite TV service. The strategy is still being worked out. Nonetheless, the audience will be in for a new avatar of TV viewing experience.

Films
Being born to a film family, Swapna was more interested in behind the camera aspect of Indian movies. She associated her father in film production in the beginning of her career and later she co-produced movies with her father in the banner of Vyjayanthi Movies. On 2014 Swapna launched Swapna Cinema, under the banner swapna and her sister priyanka co-produced Yevade Subramanyam. Much of the filming took place at the Everest Base Camp, becoming the first Indian film to be shot at the location. Film was both critically and commercially successful in box office. Swapna is now on the pre-production works of her new untitled movie.

Filmography

Films

Television

Awards 
  Nandi Award for Best Feature Film - Yevade Subramanyam (2015)
 Filmfare Award for Best Film - Telugu - Mahanati (2018)
 SIIMA Award for Best Film - Mahanati (2018)
 Zee Cine Awards Telugu - Mahanati (2018)
 National Film Award for Best Feature Film in Telugu - Mahanati (2018)

References

External links
 

Businesspeople from Vijayawada
Telugu film producers
Indian women film producers
1981 births
Living people
Film producers from Andhra Pradesh
Businesswomen from Andhra Pradesh
Indian women television producers
Women television producers
Zee Cine Awards Telugu winners